"Eucosma" chloromima is a species of moth of the family Tortricidae. It is found in China (Guangxi, Sichuan), Kashmir and India.

References

Moths described in 1931
Eucosmini